This is a list of magazines and periodicals currently published within South Africa.

A

AA Traveller
Africa Geographic 
 Africa South
 African Expedition Magazine
African Independent
African Pilot
Amakhosi
Amandla
Animaltalk
Architect & Specificator
Auto Trader

B

Baba & Kleuter
Barbie
Bicycling
Bike SA Magazine
Black Business Quarterly
Bona
Brainstorm
Brand
Business Brief
Bulk Handling Today

C

CAR
Caravan & Outdoor Life
CEO
Cirque Magazine
CLASSICFEEL
Compleat Golfer
The Complete Fly Fisher
House & Garden (South Africa)
Corporate Finance Africa Magazine 
Cosmopolitan
CSA (Cricket SA) (note that CSA (Cricket SA) and SA Cricket are two different magazines)

D

Debate Journal
Dekat
Destiny
Destiny Man
Digital Life
Divestyle
DO IT NOW Magazine
Drive Out
Drum

E

Elle Decoration
Elle Magazine
Engineering News
Entrepreneur Magazine
Essentials

F

FA News 
Fair Lady
Farmer's Weekly
Farmlink
Femina
FHM
Financial Mail
Finesse
Finweek
Food & Home Entertaining
Forbes Africa
Fresh Living (Pick 'n Pay)
Fund Investor Insight

G

G Tribe
The Gardener Magazine
Getaway
GINJA Food & Lifestyle Magazine
Girlz Magazine
Glamour
Goeie Huishouding
Golf Digest
Good Housekeeping
Good Taste
GQ SA
 Grace
The Grapevine Magazine
Grazia SA
GT MAG

H

Habitat
Heat
Home
House & Leisure
HQ (Horse Quarterly) 
Huisgenoot
Hustler (S.A. edition)
Hype
Hello Cape Town
Hello Joburg

I
Ideas / Idees
Ignited Woman Mag
Intiem
Institutional Strategy Insights
InStyle
iWeek

J
Jewish Life
JOY! Magazine
JSE
JUIG! Tydskrif

K
Kagenna Magazine
Kick Off
Kuier

L

Landbouweekblad
Leadership
Lééf Met Hart & Siel (Live With Heart & Soul)
Leisure wheels
LiG
Lightstand
Live Mag SA
LIVEOUTLOUD Magazine 
Living & Loving
Longevity
LoslyfLoslyf

M

Mahala
Mamas & Papas
Manwees
Marie Claire
Marketing Mix
Maxim
Men's Health
Mense
Mining Weekly
Modern Athlete
Modern Cyclist
Most Influential Women in Business and Government
Move! 
Mshana
Metros Magazine, South Africa
Mum's Mail"My LoopbaanNNational GeographicNewsweekNaked MotoringNoseweekOO, The Oprah MagazineOdyssey MagazineON POINT MagazineOnTheBlockOld Africa MagazinePPageant Magazine SAPCFormatPeoplePersonal FinancePM Africa MagazinePopular MechanicsPrestige BulletinQ
Quick Read Papu

RRadio ZSReader's Digest SARealreality by SanlamRideRooi RoseRunner's WorldSSA 4x4SA Career FocusSA CricketSA Country LifeSA FlyerSA Garden &HomeSA Golf TraderSA Home OwnerSA Hunter / JagterSA IndiaSA Rugby MagazineSafe Travel MagazineSaltwater GirlSA Mechanical EngineerSandton SarieSarie KosSavage MagazineSeventeenSL MagazineSomething WickedSoulSpeed & SoundStockFarmStudent MagStuffStyleStywe Lyne (Tight Lines)Submerge MagazineSucceed MagazineSupernova - the mag for curious kidsTTaste magazine (Woolworths)Tectonic MagazineTeen ZoneThings to do With Kids MagazineTimeTitans Building NationsTop BillingTop CarTop Gear SATourism Tattler Trade Journal 
 The Townships HousewifeTravel IdeasTrue Love Die Tuinier TydskrifTuisVVeeplaasVery InterestingVery Interesting JuniorVrouekeurWWeg! / Go!WegRyWegSleepWeigh-LessWesley Guild MagazineWiel Motor MagazineWildWoemaWoman & HomeWomen's HealthWrappedYYOUYour BabyYour BusinessYour FamilyYour PregnancyZZigzag Surf Magazine''

See also
 List of newspapers in South Africa
 List of radio stations in South Africa
 South African Audience Research Foundation (SAARF)

References

External links
  

 
South Africa
Magazines